Pat Henry may refer to:
Pat Henry (athletics coach) (born 1951), track & field coach at Texas A&M University
Pat Henry (politician) (1861–1933), U.S. Representative from Mississippi
Pat Henry (comedian) (1924–1982), American comedian 
 Pat Henry, chairman of the Atlanta convention Dragon Con

See also
Patrick Henry (disambiguation)